Bainville may refer to:

Bainville, Montana
Bainville-aux-Miroirs
 , ruined, former seat of the Lords of Vaudémont
Bainville-aux-Saules
Bainville-sur-Madon
Jacques Bainville